This is a list of Samoans on Wikipedia in alphabetical order by occupation.

Arts and literature

 Tusiata Avia
 Serie Barford
 Joseph Churchward
 Fatu Feu'u
 Sia Figiel
Niki Hastings-McFall
Shigeyuki Kihara
Lily Laita
Janet Lilo
Savea Sano Malifa
Marina Alofagia McCartney
Dan Taulapapa McMullin
Courtney Sina Meredith
Josefa Moe
Lino Nelisi
Sua Sulu'ape Paulo II
Johnny Penisula
Sapa'u Ruperake Petaia
Lemi Ponifasio
Greg Semu
Leilani Tamu
Teuane Tibbo
Angela Tiatia
Michel Tuffery
Momoe Malietoa Von Reiche
Albert Wendt
Lani Wendt-Young

Business

Emma Coe
Monica Galetti
Aggie Grey
Alexia Hilbertidou
Maposua Rudolf Keil
Gustavia Lui
Olaf Frederick Nelson
Matai’a Lynn Netzler
Tupua Fred Wetzell

Education

Donna Rose Addis
Tuifuisa’a Patila Amosa
Mary Elizabeth Brown
Peggy Fairbairn-Dunlop
Brianna Fruean
Aiono Fanaafi Le Tagaloa
Salu Hunkin-Finau
Tania Ka'ai
Folole Muliaga
Dawn Rasmussen
Damon Salesa
Fuiono Senio
Caroline Sinavaiana-Gabbard
Valerie Saena Tuia
Teo Tuvale
Emma Kruse Va'ai

Entertainment

Actors

Frankie Adams
Cooper Andrews
KJ Apa
Jaclyn Betham
Teuila Blakely
Goretti Chadwick
Andrew Cooper
Eteuati Ete
Aaron Fa'aoso
David Fane
Tofiga Fepulea'i
Mario Gaoa
Nephi Hannemann
Al Harrington
Dwayne Johnson
Oscar Kightley
Beulah Koale
Jay Laga'aia
Nathaniel Lees
Pua Magasiva
Robbie Magasiva
Rose Matafeo
Joe Naufahu
Rene Naufahu
Anapela Polataivao
Tanoai Reed
Fa'afiaula Sagote
Victoria Schmidt
Peter Tuiasosopo
Lani Tupu
Jared Turner
Sima Urale
Taylor Wily
Nuufolau Joel Seanoa

Bands

3 the Hard Way
Adeaze
Boo-Yaa T.R.I.B.E.
Common Kings
Deceptikonz
Double J and Twice the T
Fat Freddy's Drop
Frontline
Herbs
Home Brew Crew
Ilanda
Kulcha
Nesian Mystik
Onefour
Pacific Soul
Sol3 Mio
Te Vaka
The Five Stars
The Katinas
The Keil Isles
The Yandall Sisters

Dancers

Parris Goebel
Neil Ieremia
Freddie Letuli
Tony Meredith

Filmmakers

Queen Muhammad Ali
Aaron Fa'aoso
John Kneubuhl
Vela Manusaute
Dan Taulapapa McMullin
Victor Rodger
Louis Sutherland
Tusi Tamasese
Lisa Taouma
Makerita Urale
Sima Urale

Groups

Laughing Samoans
Naked Samoans

News Media

Autagavaia Tipi Autagavaia
Daniel Faitaua
April Ieremia
Savea Sano Malifa
Eti Saaga
Pippa Wetzell

Singers/Musicians

Nick Afoa
Alex Aiono
Tedashii Lavoy Anderson (Tedashii)
John Matakite Chong-nee (Chong Nee)
Jackie Clarke
Aivale Cole
Daniel Rae Costello
David Dallas
Iosefa Enari
Kas Futialo (Tha Feelstyle)
Taimane Gardner (Taimane)
Jade Goto (Jay'ed)
Jerome Grey
Dinah Jane Hansen (Dinah Jane)
Sam Hansen (PNC)
Vince Harder
Maryanne Ito
Jacob Scott Jones (Iakopo)
Alphonso Keil
Eliza Keil
Freddie Keil
Herma Keil
Olaf Keil
Exodus Lale
Jonathan Lemalu
Youngn Lipz
Robyn Loau
Tenelle Luafalemana (Tenelle)
Malo Jeshua Ioane Luafutu (Scribe)
Tau Moe
Isabella Moore
 Aaradhna Patel (Aaradhna) 
Mavis Rivers
Sanerivi Sagala (Dei Hamo)
Mark Sagapolutele (Mareko)
Demetrius Savelio (Savage)
Simeona Silapa (Hooligan Hefs)
Karoline Tamati (Ladi6)
Mariota Tiumalu Tuiasosopo
Napoleon Andrew Tuiteleleapaga
Bill Urale (King Kapisi)
Rosita Vai
Cheryl Deserée Vaimoso-Adams (Cheryl Deserée)
Emily Williams
Joshua Elia Williams (J. Williams)
Kingdon Chapple-Wilson (Kings)
Pati Umaga

Fashion

Latafale Auva'a
Storm Keating
Marion Malena
Renera Thompson
Gabby Westbrook-Patrick

Medicine

Esther Tumama Cowley-Malcolm
Fuimaono Karl Pulotu-Endemann
Erna Takazawa
Walter Vermeulen

Politics

Sua Rimoni Ah Chong
Muagututagata Peter Ah Him
Tofilau Eti Alesana
Gatoloaifaana Amataga Alesana-Gidlow
Arthur Anae
Le Mamea Matatumua Ata
Josephine Bartley
Toi Aukuso Cain
Tuala Falani Chan Tung
Peter Tali Coleman
Tufuga Efi
Eni Faleomavaega
Lualemaga Faoa
Taito Phillip Field
Alf Filipaina
Mike Gabbard
Tulsi Gabbard
Gaioi Tufele Galeai
Mark Gosche
Mufi Hannemann
Brenda Heather-Latu
Mata'afa Iosefo
Tuala Ainiu Iusitino
Luagalau Levaula Kamu
Va'ai Kolone
Seui Laau
Winnie Laban
Tuiloma Pule Lameko
Malietoa Laupepa
Aifili Paulo Lauvao (A. P. Lutali)
Aiono Fanaafi Le Tagaloa
Tupua Tamasese Lealofi III
Niko Lee Hang
Tuli Le’iato
Falema‘i Lesa
Tufele Liamatua
Leilua Lino
Peseta Sam Lotu-Iiga
Richard Lussick
Afoa Moega Lutu
Fialupe Felila Fiaui Lutu
Matatumua Maimoana
Utu Abe Malae
Edgar Malepeai
Tuilaepa Aiono Sailele Malielegaoi
Tuala Falenaoti Tiresa Malietoa
Ida Malosi
Lauaki Namulauulu Mamoe
Tee Masaniai
Fiame Naomi Mata'afa
Laulu Fetauimalemau Mata'afa
Lemanu Peleti Mauga
Tupua Tamasese Mea'ole
Tauili'ili Uili Meredith
Malietoa Moli
Lolo Matalasi Moliga
Fiame Mata'afa Faumuina Mulinu'u II
Mata'afa Faumuina Fiame Mulinu'u I
Olive Nelson
Safuneitu'uga Pa'aga Neri
Tanu Nona
Aveau Niko Palamo
A'eau Peniamina
Le Tagaloa Pita
Galea'i Peni Poumele
Amata Coleman Radewagen
Misa Telefoni Retzlaff
Le Mamea Ropati
To’alepaiali’i Toeolesulusulu Salesa III
Larry Sanitoa
Patu Tiava'asu'e Falefatu Sapolu
Vui Florence Saulo
Tofā Sauni
Velega Savali
Polataivao Fosi Schmidt
Lefau Harry Schuster
Carmel Sepuloni
William Sio
Tuiloma Neroni Slade
Aiono Nonumalo Sofara
Liufau Sonoma
Va'aletoa Sualauvi II
Faoa Aitofele Sunia
Tauese Sunia
Malietoa Tanumafili I
Malietoa Tanumafili II
Tu'u'u Ieti Taulealo
Tafaoimalo Leilani Tuala-Warren
Tu'u'u Ieti Taulealo
Fuimaono Naoia Tei
Tole’afoa Solomona To’ailoa
Mata Tuatagaloa
Tuanaitau F. Tuia
Tuitama Talalelei Tuitama
Save Liuato Tuitele
Tuika Tuika
Togiola Tulafono
Tuala Falani Chan Tung
Andria Tupola
Bode Uale
Asiata Sale'imoa Va'ai
Tamaseu Leni Warren

Religion

Iliafi Esera
Otto Vincent Haleck
Samani Pulepule
Pio Taofinu'u
Taimalelagi Fagamalama Tuatagaloa-Leota

Sports

American football

Isaako Aaitui
George Achica
Al Afalava
C.J. Ah You
Harland Ah You
Junior Ah You
James Aiono
Clifton Alapa
Tyson Alualu
Brad Anae
Robert Anae
Ricky Andrews
Charley Ane
Charlie Ane
Donovan Arp
Devin Asiasi
Isaac Asiata
Johan Asiata
Matt Asiata
Junior Aumavae
Sal Aunese
Kahlil Bell
Kendrick Bourne
Inoke Breckterfield
Algie Brown
Richard Brown
DeForest Buckner
Su'a Cravens
Scott Crichton
Hershel Dennis
Pita Elisara
Luther Elliss
Justin Ena
A.J. Epenesa
DeQuin Evans
Daniel Faalele
Nuu Faaola
Jonathan Fanene
Ta'ase Faumui
Wilson Faumuina
Eletise Fiatoa
Malcom Floyd
Fou Fonoti
Toniu Fonoti
Chris Fuamatu-Maʻafala
Setema Gali
Haskell Garrett
Randall Goforth
Wayne Hunter
Nate Ilaoa
Junior Ioane
Joey Iosefa
Sale Isaia
Mike Iupati
Senio Kelemete
Pat Kesi
Hau'oli Kikaha
Glen Kozlowski
Mike Kozlowski
Jake Kuresa
Shawn Lauvao
Dave Lefotu
Kili Lefotu
Sefo Liufau
Joe Lobendahn
Al Lolotai
Shalom Luani
Frankie Luvu
Palauni Ma Sun
Malaefou MacKenzie
Kaluka Maiava
Jordan Mailata
Damien Mama
Frank Manumaleuga
Brandon Manumaleuna
Vince Manuwai
Marcus Mariota
Jeremiah Masoli
Hercules Mata'afa
Fred Matua
Rey Maualuga
Josh Mauga
Reagan Maui'a
Itula Mili
Roy Miller
Trevor Misipeka
Edwin Mulitalo
Louis Murphy
Kai Nacua
Jim Nicholson
Ken Niumatalolo
Al Noga
Niko Noga
Shaun Nua
Joe Onosai
Nate Orchard
Lonnie Palelei
Anton Palepoi
Tenny Palepoi
Joe Paopao
David Parry
Saul Patu
Domata Peko
Kyle Peko
Tupe Peko
Leonard Peters
Ropati Pitoitua
Kennedy Polamalu
Troy Polamalu
Isaiah Pola-Mao
Jeremiah Poutasi
Tavita Pritchard
Roman Pritt
Mike Purcell
Gabe Reid
Jason Rivers
Pio Sagapolutele
Blaine Saipaia
Joe Salave'a
Dan Saleaumua
Dru Samia
Lauvale Sape
Jesse Sapolu
Don Sasa
Brashton Satele
Samson Satele
Brian Schwenke
Kona Schwenke
Ian Seau
Junior Seau
Mike Sellers
Isaac Seumalo
Nephi Sewell
Noah Sewell
Penei Sewell
Khalil Shakir
Danny Shelton
Junior Siavii
Sealver Siliga
Mana Silva
JuJu Smith-Schuster
Brian Soi
Paul Soliai
Vic So'oto
Xavier Su'a-Filo
Nicky Sualua
Frank Summers
Alameda Ta'amu
Ed Taʻamu
Jordan Ta'amu
Nu'u Tafisi
Taulia Tagovailoa
Tua Tagovailoa
Maa Tanuvasa
Lofa Tatupu
Mosi Tatupu
Vai Taua
Will Taʻufoʻou
Junior Tautalatasi
Terry Tautolo
Sae Tautu
J.R. Tavai
Daniel Te'o-Nesheim
Manti Te'o
Martin Tevaseu
Jack Thompson
D.J. Tialavea
John Timu
Pisa Tinoisamoa
Albert Toeaina
Matt Toeaina
Pago Togafau
Levine Toilolo
Mao Tosi
Charles Tuaau
Esera Tuaolo
Natu Tuatagaloa
Manu Tuiasosopo
Marques Tuiasosopo
Lavasier Tuinei
Mark Tuinei
Van Tuinei
Joe Tuipala
Willie Tuitama
Maugaula Tuitele
DJ Uiagalelei
Mike Ulufale
Morris Unutoa
Tuufuli Uperesa
Destiny Vaeao
Jeremiah Valoaga
Lenny Vandermade
Larry Warford
Jaylen Warren
Albert Wilson

Baseball

Benny Agbayani
Chris Aguila
Mike Fetters
Jacob Hannemann
Isiah Kiner-Falefa
Wes Littleton
Sean Manaea
Tony Solaita
Matt Tuiasosopo

Basketball

Rashaun Broadus
Leon Henry
Shea Ili
James Johnson
Bubba Lau'ese
Naomi Mulitauaopele
Daishen Nix
Dion Prewster
Kalani Purcell
Charmian Purcell
Natalie Purcell
Wally Rank
Peyton Siva
John Tofi
Drake U'u
Mekeli Wesley
Wendell White

Boxing

Monty Betham Jr
Monty Betham Sr
Richard Betham
Herman Ene-Purcell
Emerio Fainuulua
Lio Falaniko
Sililo Figota
Polataivao Fosi
Warren Fuavailili
Bob Gasio
Alex Leapai
David Letele
Togasilimai Letoa
Patrick Mailata
Maselino Masoe
Mika Masoe
Alrie Meleisea
Birthony Katarina Nansen (Baby Nansen)
Jai Opetaia
Joseph Parker
Tuna Scanlan
Ray Sefo
Vaitele Soi
Jason Suttie
Apollo Sweet
Lawrence Tauasa
Satupaitea Farani Tavui
James Senio Peau (Jimmy Thunder)
David Tua
Maselino Tuifao

Cricket 

Ken Kinnersley
Sebastian Kohlhase
Ata Matatumua
Rodney Reid
Murphy Su'a
Ross Taylor

Diving

Greg Louganis

Mixed Martial Arts

Kailin Curran
Genah Fabian
Andre Fili
Kendall Grove
Max Holloway
Mark Hunt
Lolohea Mahe
Raquel Pa'aluhi
Tyson Pedro
Eric Pele
Siala-Mou Siliga (Mighty Mo)
Tai Tuivasa
Falaniko Vitale
Robert Whittaker

Netball

Aliyah Dunn
Sheryl Clarke-Scanlan
Rita Fatialofa-Paloto
Paula Griffin
April Ieremia
Bernice Mene
Julianna Naoupu
Rachel Rasmussen
Grace Rasmussen
Frances Solia
Lorna Suafoa
Maria Tutaia
Linda Vagana

Professional Wrestling

Joseph Afamasaga (Samoan Joe)
Afa Anoaʻi (Wild Samoans)
Afa Anoaʻi Jr. (Manu)
Leati Joseph Anoa'i (Roman Reigns)
Lloyd Anoaʻi (L.A. Smooth)
Matthew Anoa'i (Rosey)
Rodney Anoa'i (Yokozuna)
Samula Anoa'i (Samu)
Sika Anoaʻi (Wild Samoans)
Cheree Crowley (Dakota Kai)
Emily Dole (Mountain Fiji)
Ulualoaiga Onosai Tauolo Emelio (Cocoa Samoa)
Savelina Fanene (Nia Jax)
Edward Fatu (Umaga)
Jonathan Fatu (The Usos)
Joseph Fatu (Solo Sikoa)
Joshua Fatu (The Usos)
Sam Fatu (The Tonga Kid)
Solofa Fatu (Rikishi)
Dwayne Johnson (The Rock)
Danielle Kamela (Vanessa Borne)
Neff Maiava
Lia Maivia
Peter Maivia
Sean Maluta
Nuufolau Seanoa (Samoa Joe)
Sonny Siaki
James Snuka (Deuce)
Sarona Snuka (Tamina Snuka)
James Reiher Snuka (Jimmy Snuka)
Daniel Vidot (Xyon Quinn)
•  Leia Makoa

Rugby Union/League

Brad Abbey
Failaga Afamasaga
Jack Afamasaga
Viliamu Afatia
Vavao Afemai
Bunty Afoa
Fa'ausu Afoa
John Afoa
Fred Ah Kuoi
John Ah Kuoi
Isaak Ah Mau
Leeson Ah Mau
Cruze Ah-Nau
Patrick Ah Van
Nigel Ah Wong
Rodney Ah You
Pita Ahki
Andrew Aiolupo
Bundee Aki
Allan Alaalatoa
Harlan Alaalatoa
Michael Ala'alatoa
Vili Alaalatoa
Solomon Alaimalo
Brian Alainu'uese
AJ Alatimu
Robbie Ale
Paul Alo-Emile
Alofa Alofa
Josh Aloiai
Tom Amone
Albert Anae
Sosene Anesi
Daejarn Asi
Polo Asi
John Asiata
Nelson Asofa-Solomona
Roy Asotasi
Ben Atiga
Uini Atonio
Fotunuupule Auelua
Asafo Aumua
Fa'atoina Autagavaia
Kirisome Auva'a
Ole Avei
Graeme Bachop
Stephen Bachop
Andreas Bauer
Andrew Bentley
Kane Bentley
Peter Betham
Mark Birtwistle
Dean Blore
Shawn Blore
Andrew Blowers
Brandon Boor
Donald Brighouse
Dylan Brown
Fa'amanu Brown
Olo Brown
Willie Brown
Frank Bunce
George Carmont
Michael Chee-Kam
Erin Clark
Caleb Clarke
Eroni Clarke
John Clarke
Jerry Collins
Garrick Cowley
Pele Cowley
Christian Crichton
Loki Crichton
Stephen Crichton
Christian Cullen
Oscar Danielson
Matt Duffie
Elia Elia
Mark Elia
Alex Elisala
Ere Enari
Kane Epati
Herman Ese'ese
Tiffany Fa’ae’e
Henry Fa'afili
Sef Fa'agase
David Fa'alogo
Tupo Fa'amasino
Fiao'o Fa'amausili
Poasa Faamausili
Jamason Faʻanana-Schultz
Piula Faʻasalele
Maurie Fa'asavalu
So'otala Fa'aso'o
Tino Fa'asuamaleaui
Lome Fa'atau
Leo Faaeteete
George Fai
Sonny Fai
TJ Faiane
Kalifa Faifai Loa
Esene Faimalo
Raymond Faitala-Mariner
David Faiumu
Kepi Faiva'ai
Max Fala
Terry Fanolua
Ron Fanuatanu
Alafoti Fa'osiliva
Bureta Faraimo
David Fatialofa
Peter Fatialofa
Charlie Faumuina
Sione Faumuina
Max Feagai
Chris Feauai-Sautia
Dominic Fe'aunati
Isaac Fe'aunati
JJ Felise
Maika Felise
Daniel Fepuleai
Vincent Fepulea'i
Fa'atonu Fili
Karl Filiga
Olsen Filipaina
Marvin Filipo
Ross Filipo
Nic Fitisemanu
Theresa Fitzpatrick
Greg Foe
DJ Forbes
Kahn Fotuali'i
Robbie Fruean
Steve Fualau
Tani Fuga
Tyrell Fuimaono
Eliota Fuimaono-Sapolu
Beau Gallagher
Joe Galuvao
Connor Garden-Bachop
Jackson Garden-Bachop
James Gavet
Simon Geros
Craig Glendinning
Pita Godinet
Payne Haas
Harrison Hansen
George Harder
Jamie Helleur
Roman Hifo
Carl Hoeft
Phoenix Hunapo-Nofoa
Hymel Hunt
Karmichael Hunt
Royce Hunt
Jordan Hyland
Alama Ieremia
Len Ikitau
Stacey Ili
Krisnan Inu
Akira Ioane
Digby Ioane
Eddie Ioane
Josh Ioane
Mark Ioane
Rieko Ioane
TJ Ioane
Rodney Iona
Iopu Iopu-Aso
Masada Iosefa
Willie Isa
Jamayne Isaako
Malaki Iupeli
Census Johnston
James Johnston
Michael Jones
Jerome Kaino
Danny Kaleopa
Sam Kaleta
Sam Kasiano
Mat Keenan
Darren Kellett
Richard Kennar
Milford Keresoma
Lolani Koko
Vae Kololo
Tony Koonwaiyou
Josh Kronfeld
Timothy Lafaele
Tim Lafai
Leo Lafaiali'i
Shane Laloata
Junior Laloifi
Ben Lam
Jack Lam
Pat Lam
George Latu
Ali Lauiti'iti
Casey Laulala
Luteru Laulala
Nepo Laulala
Brian Laumatia
Quentin Laulu-Togaga'e
Tasesa Lavea
Jordan Lay
Silao Leaega
Charlie Leaeno
Mark Leafa
Patrick Leafa
Kas Lealamanua
Christian Lealiifano
Brian Leauma
George Leaupepe
Potu Leavasa
Fritz Lee
Tala Leiasamaivao
Joseph Leilua
Luciano Leilua
Alapati Leiua
Na'ama Leleimalefaga
Fa'atiga Lemalu
Simon Lemalu
Saini Lemamea
David Lemi
Spencer Leniu
Daniel Leo
Johnny Leota
Moses Leota
Trevor Leota
Jeff Lepa
Tuaalagi Lepupa
Kylie Leuluai
Phillip Leuluai
Thomas Leuluai
Vincent Leuluai
Tamato Leupolu
Ricky Leutele
Faifili Levave
Danny Levi
Filipo Levi
Anton Lienert-Brown
Daniel Lienert-Brown
Palemia Lilomaiava
Brian Lima
Danny Lima
Jeff Lima
Peter Lima
Mason Lino
Lamar Liolevave
Sam Lisone
Isaac Liu
Jamahl Lolesi
Keith Lowen
Jarome Luai
Ekeroma Luaiufi
Joel Luani
Steve Luatua
Dunamis Lui
Lolo Lui
Des Maea
Patrick Mago
Uale Mai
Hutch Maiava
Sean Maitland
Reni Maitua
Jeff Makapelu
Gus Malietoa-Brown
Clifford Manua
Penani Manumalealii
Seilala Mapusua
Lelia Masaga
Chris Masoe
Mose Masoe
Willie Mason
Suaia Matagi
Steve Matai
Onehunga Matauiau
Chanel Mata'utia
Pat Mata'utia
Peter Mata'utia
Sione Mata'utia
Vila Matautia
Ben Matulino
Aaron Mauger
Nathan Mauger
Ken Maumalo
Tyrone May
Taylan May
Wayne McDade
Josh McGuire
Jerry Meafou
Kelly Meafua
Keven Mealamu
Francis Meli
Jonathan Meredith
Steve Meredith
Liam Messam
Dom Michael
Brad Mika
Constantine Mika
Dylan Mika
Michael Mika
Simaika Mikaele
Anthony Milford
Laloa Milford
Tautau Moga
Peewee Moke
Junior Moors
Richard Mo'unga
Mils Muliaina
Logovi'i Mulipola
Lucky Mulipola
Ronaldo Mulitalo
Zane Musgrove
Heka Nanai
Melani Nanai
Tim Nanai-Williams
George Naoupu
Sene Naoupu
Ben Nee-Nee
Elijah Niko
David Nofoaluma
Ma'a Nonu
Tu Nu'uali'itia
Frank-Paul Nu'uausala
John Nuumaalii
Ray Ofisa
Hitro Okesene
Paul Okesene
Duncan Paia'aua
Fosi Pala'amo
Thretton Palamo
Keenan Palasia
Iafeta Paleaaesina
Opeta Palepoi
Sam Panapa
Abraham Papalii
Isaiah Papali'i
Josh Papalii
Junior Paramore
Pauli Pauli
Maselino Paulino
Filo Paulo
Joseph Paulo
Junior Paulo (born 1983)
Junior Paulo (born 1993)
Ti’i Paulo
Junior Pelesasa
Daniel Penese
Apollo Perelini
Anthony Perenise
Paul Perez
Sam Perrett
Mikaele Pesamino
Fred Petersen
Eddy Pettybourne
Dominique Peyroux
George Pisi
Ken Pisi
Tusi Pisi
Robert Piva
Mataupu Poching
Willie Poching
Junior Poluleuligaga
Peter Poulos
Frank Pritchard
Kaysa Pritchard
Esera Puleitu
Frank Puletua
Tony Puletua
Augustine Pulu
Edward Purcell
Justin Purdie
Dale Rasmussen
Brendan Reidy
Nathaniel Roache
Ben Roberts
Iva Ropati
Jerome Ropati
Joe Ropati
Peter Ropati
Romi Ropati
Tangi Ropati
Tea Ropati
Setaimata Sa
Fereti Sa'aga
Filipo Saena
Daniel Saifiti
Jacob Saifiti
Francis Saili
Peter Saili
Solomona Sakalia
Muliufi Salanoa
Manaia Salavea
Toa Samania
Luke Samoa
Smith Samau
Phillip Sami
Luke Samoa
Ligi Sao
Junior Sa'u
Sami Sauiluma
Ardie Savea
Julian Savea
Andre Savelio
John Schuster
Peter Schuster
John Schwalger
Mahonri Schwalger
Silao Vaisola Sefo
Patrick Segi
Aki Seiuli
Jesse Sene-Lefao
John Senio
Kevin Senio
Mike Setefano
Lagi Setu
Terence Seu Seu
Taleni Seu
Ava Seumanufagai
Jerry Seuseu
Elvis Seveali'i
Regina Sheck
Siliva Siliva
Tim Simona
Irae Simone
Fata Sini
Sinoti Sinoti
David Sio
Ken Sio
Keneti Sio
Michael Sio
Scott Sio
Toafofoa Sipley
Semo Sititi
Cameron Skelton
Will Skelton
Chad Slade
Jeremy Smith
Iosia Soliola
Dave Solomon
Frank Solomon
David Solomona
Denny Solomona
Malo Solomona
Se'e Solomona
Afato So'oalo
James So'oialo
Rodney So'oialo
Steven So'oialo
Lima Sopoaga
Tupou Sopoaga
Mike Sosene-Feagai
Charlie Staines
Benson Stanley
Chase Stanley
Jeremy Stanley
Joe Stanley
Kyle Stanley
Michael Stanley
Sam Stanley
Miguel Start
George Stowers
Shannon Stowers
Jaydn Su'A
Jeremy Su'a
Joseph Suaalii
Sauaso Sue
Andrew Suniula
Roland Suniula
Shalom Suniula
Anthony Swann
Logan Swann
Willie Swann
Conrad Ta'akimoeaka
Sene Ta'ala
Niva Ta'auso
Angus Ta'avao
Henry Taefu
Pelu Taele
Timo Tagaloa
Sam Tagataese
Sailosi Tagicakibau
Izack Tago
Pingi Tala'apitaga
Willie Talau
Albert Talipeau
Robert Tanielu
Ben Tapuai
Lama Tasi
Tautalatasi Tasi
Josh Tatupu
Tony Tatupu
Jordan Taufua
Jorge Taufua
Mark Taufua
Jamie-Jerry Taulagi
Murray Taulagi
Misi Taulapapa
Martin Taupau
Taulima Tautai
Ezra Taylor
Joe Tekori
Mark Telea
Ben Te'o
Jazz Tevaga
Kane Thompson
Junior Tia-Kilifi
Neemia Tialata
Chase Tiatia
Filo Tiatia
Caleb Timu
Filipo Toala
Isaia Toeava
Kalolo Toleafoa
Senio Toleafoa
Onosai Tololima-Auva'a
Joe Tomane
Sio Tomkinson
Jeremy Tomuli
Lama Tone
Willie Tonga
Young Tonumaipea
Ofisa Tonu'u
Motu Tony
Brian To'o
Renouf To'omaga
Jeffery Toomaga-Allen
Stan To'omalatai
Matt To'omua
Ofisa Treviranus
Ahsee Tuala
Enari Tuala
Belgium Tuatagaloa
Lukhan Tui
Ruby Tui
Mose Tuiali'i
Des Tuiavi'i
Isaia Tuifua
Taiasina Tuifu'a
Sonny Tuigamala
Va'aiga Tuigamala
Alesana Tuilagi
Anitelea Tuilagi
Fred Tuilagi
Freddie Tuilagi
Henry Tuilagi
Manu Tuilagi
Sanele Vavae Tuilagi
Kalolo Tuiloma
Carlos Tuimavave
Evarn Tuimavave
Paddy Tuimavave
Tony Tuimavave
Patrick Tuipulotu
Roger Tuivasa-Sheck
Alatasi Tupou
Jimmy Tupou
Alisi Tupuailei
Richard Turner
Denning Tyrell
Joseph Ualesi
Braden Uele
Tauvere Ugapo
Ulia Ulia
Wayne Ulugia
Jack Umaga
Jacob Umaga
Mike Umaga
Tana Umaga
Thomas Umaga-Jensen
Matt Utai
Earl Va'a
Justin Va'a
Brando Va'aulu
Mathew Vaea
Chris Vaefaga
Matt Vaega
To’o Vaega
Alfie Vaeluaga
Joe Vagana
Nigel Vagana
Siaosi Vaili
Alefaio Vaisuai
Paterika Vaivai
Taioalo Vaivai
Gray Viane
Daniel Vidot
Tanner Vili
Kitiona Viliamu
Va'apu'u Vitale
Lolagi Visinia
Victor Vito
Michael von Dincklage
Ruben Wiki
Bryan Williams
Darrell Williams
Daryl Williams
Dennis A. Williams
Gavin Williams
Niall Williams
Nick Williams
Paul Williams
Sonny Bill Williams
Tim Winitana
Antonio Winterstein
Frank Winterstein
Psalm Wooching
Matthew Wright
Rudi Wulf
Vincent Wulf

Soccer

Sarai Bareman
Michael Boxall
Nikko Boxall
Dennis Bryce
Filipo Bureta
Chris Cahill
Tim Cahill
Paul Collins
Jared Curtis
Joseph Dan-Tyrell
Shaun Easthope
Amilale Esaroma
Desmond Fa'aiuaso
Vaalii Faalogo
Sopo FaKaua
Tama Fasavalu
Sandra Fruean
Seth Galloway
Jordan Grantz
Motu Hafoka
Johnny Hall
Faitalia Hamilton-Pama
Ethan Hanns
Cameron Howieson
Benson Hunt
Dane Ingham
Jai Ingham
Bevan Kapisi
Keone Kapisi
Peni Kitiona
Vito Laloata
Iofi Lalogafuafua
Renee Leota
Soliai Letutusa
Tunoa Lui
Samuelu Malo
Silao Malo
Iosefa Maposua
Ryan Martin
Faalavelave Matagi
Junior Michael
Andrew Mobberley
Mariah Nogueira-Bullock
Jasmine Pereira
Jaiyah Saelua
Nicky Salapu
Mike Saofaiga
Paulo Scanlan
Pasi Schwalger
Andrew Setefano
Jason Si'i
T. Tapunuu
Lionel Taylor
Lapalapa Toni
Bill Tuiloma

Softball

Jocelyn Alo
Megan Faraimo
Tiare Jennings
Chris Kohlhase
Eddie Kohlhase
Ruta Lealamanua
Dejah Mulipola
Keilani Ricketts
Samantha Ricketts

Sumo Wrestling

Saleva'a Fuauli Atisano'e (Konishiki Yasokichi)
Fiamalu Penitani (Musashimaru Kōyō)
Kilifi Sapa (Nankairyū Tarō)
Taylor Wily (Takamikuni)

Swimming

Evelina Afoa
Daniel Bell
Gabrielle Fa'amausili
Orinoco Faamausili-Banse
Virginia Farmer
Lelei Fonoimoana
Megan Fonteno
Kokoro Frost
Stewart Glenister
Emma Hunter
Robin Leamy
Micah Masei
Ching Maou Wei
Monica Saili
Tilali Scanlan
Brandon Schuster
Lushavel Stickland
Alania Suttie

Tennis

Maylani Ah Hoy
Destanee Aiava
Steffi Carruthers
Annerly Poulos
Tagifano So'Onalole
Claudine Toleafoa

Track and Field

Maggie Aiono
Serafina Akeli
Sarah Cowley
Aunese Curreen
Jeremy Dodson
Elama Fa’atonu
Gary Fanelli
William Fong
Emanuele Fuamatu
Faresa Kapisi
Alefosio Laki
Anthony Leiato
Jordan Mageo
Lisa Misipeka
Kelsey Nakanelua
Alex Rose
Savannah Sanitoa
Shanahan Sanitoa
Isaac Silafau
Henry Smith
Shaka Sola
Chris Sua'mene
Iloai Suaniu

Volleyball

Eric Fonoimoana
Falyn Fonoimoana
Tolotear Lealamanua
Nehemiah Mote
Garrett Muagututia
Leslie Tuiasosopo

Weightlifting

Eric Brown
Lopesi Faagu
Faavae Faauliuli
Vaipava Ioane
Tanumafili Jungblut
Eleei Lalio
Siaosi Leuo
Lauititi Lui
Sanele Mao
Uati Maposua
Ofisa Ofisa
Ele Opeloge
Mary Opeloge
Niusila Opeloge
Petunu Opeloge
Tovia Opeloge
Toafitu Perive
Alesana Sione
Iuniarra Sipaia
Feagaiga Stowers
Tauama Timoti

Other Sports

Silulu A'etonu (Judo)
Tumua Anae (Water Polo)
Rudolph Berking-Williams (Canoeing)
Anne Cairns (Canoeing)
Talitiga Crawley (Taekwondo)
Aaron Edwards (Australian Football)
Tony Finau (Golf)
Natasha Hansen (Cycling)
Sami Hill (Water Polo)
Joe Kayes (Water Polo)
Brad Kiltz (Bobsleigh)
Anthony Liu (Judo)
Robert Lowrance (Sailing)
Joseph Muaausa (Archery)
Faauuga Muagututia (Bobsleigh)
Bianca Netzler (Cycling)
Louis Purcell (Amateur Wrestling)
Aleni Smith (Judo)
Derek Sua (Judo)
Fua Logo Tavui (Sailing)
Kaino Thomsen (Taekwondo)
Nathaniel Tuamoheloa (Amateur Wrestling)
Maureen Tuimalealiifano (Archery)
Benjamin Waterhouse (Judo)
Travolta Waterhouse (Judo)

References

External links
Samoan Bios